Spencer is a small unincorporated crossroads in eastern Lawrence County, Missouri, United States.  It lies along former U.S. Route 66 (now a county road) approximately six miles (10 km) west of Halltown.

A post office called Spencer was established in 1868, and remained in operation until 1907. The community was named after a local merchant.

Spencer is best known for Spencer Station, a series of joined buildings consisting of a historic Phillips 66 service station & garage, a diner, a barbershop and a general store. The general store was built in 1926 while the service station was built in 1927. In 1928, the 2 separate building were connected with the barber shop and diner.

References

Unincorporated communities in Lawrence County, Missouri
Populated places established in the 1870s
Unincorporated communities in Missouri